The Trimble House is a historic house at 518 Center Street in Lonoke, Arkansas.  It is a large -story wood-frame structure, with a tall gabled roof.  A large gabled section relieves the left side of the gable, and a gable section projects from the front, from which the entry porch, also gabled, projects.  Built in 1916, it is a fine example of Craftsman architecture, designed by Charles L. Thompson.

The house was listed on the National Register of Historic Places in 1982.

See also
National Register of Historic Places listings in Lonoke County, Arkansas

References

Houses on the National Register of Historic Places in Arkansas
Houses completed in 1916
Houses in Lonoke County, Arkansas
National Register of Historic Places in Lonoke County, Arkansas
Buildings and structures in Lonoke, Arkansas